This glossary of chemistry terms is a list of terms and definitions relevant to chemistry, including chemical laws, diagrams and formulae, laboratory tools, glassware, and equipment. Chemistry is a physical science concerned with the composition, structure, and properties of matter, as well as the changes it undergoes during chemical reactions; it features an extensive vocabulary and a significant amount of jargon.

Note: All periodic table references refer to the IUPAC Style of the Periodic Table.

A

B

C

D

E

F

G

H

I

J

K

L

M

N

O

P

Q

R

S

T

U

V

W

X

Y

Z

See also
Outline of chemistry
Index of chemistry articles
List of chemical elements
Glossary of areas of mathematics
Glossary of biology
Glossary of engineering
Glossary of physics

References

External links
IUPAC Compendium of Chemical Terminology

Chemistry-related lists
Chemistry
Chemistry
Risk
Safety
Wikipedia glossaries using description lists